The Buddhist Republican Party (abbreviated BRP) was a nationalist political party in Ceylon. The party was founded by A. P. de Zoysa in 1952.

BRP fielded three candidates in the 1952 parliamentary election. The party mustered 3,987 votes (0.17% of the national vote). The election symbol of the party was a flower.

References

Defunct political parties in Sri Lanka
Nationalist parties in Sri Lanka
Political parties in Sri Lanka
Political parties established in 1952
1952 establishments in Ceylon